Jim Shipka (born c. 1935) was a Canadian football player who played for the Edmonton Eskimos. He won the Grey Cup with the Eskimos in 1956. He previously played football for the University of Alberta Golden Bears while he attended the university (Faculty of Engineering).

References

1930s births
Living people
Edmonton Elks players
Canadian football people from Edmonton
Players of Canadian football from Alberta
University of Alberta alumni